TPC Craig Ranch is a private golf club in the south central United States, located within the community of Craig Ranch in McKinney, Texas, north-northeast of Dallas.

Designed by major champion Tom Weiskopf, the championship golf course is a member of the Tournament Players Club network operated by the PGA Tour. It hosted the Nationwide Tour Championship, the season-ending tournament on the second tier Nationwide Tour (now Korn Ferry Tour), in 2008 and 2012.

The PGA Tour's AT&T Byron Nelson, once known as the Dallas Open, moved to TPC Craig Ranch in 2021.

References

External links

Golf Texas – TPC Craig Ranch
PGA Tour – AT&T Byron Nelson – Course – TPC Craig Ranch 

Buildings and structures in Collin County, Texas
Golf clubs and courses in Texas
McKinney, Texas